Amblyseius lencus is a species of mite in the family Phytoseiidae.

References

lencus
Articles created by Qbugbot
Animals described in 1999